The division of Canberra was one of the two electorates of the unicameral Australian Capital Territory House of Assembly. It elected 9 members in 1975 and 1979, and 10 members in 1982.
It was named for the city of Canberra, Australia's national capital, and included the districts of Tuggeranong, Weston Creek and Woden Valley, along with the rest of the ACT south of the Molonglo River and Lake Burley Griffin.

Members

References

History of the Australian Capital Territory
Parliament of the Australian Capital Territory
1975 establishments in Australia
1986 disestablishments in Australia
Canberra